Salmos e Cânticos Espirituais is the third studio album by Trazendo a Arca based in psalms. Was released in 2009.

Track listing
"Reina o Senhor"
"Se não fosse o Senhor"
"Nosso Deus é Santo"
"Por que Te Abates"
"Em Ti Esperarei"
"Preparado Está"
"Ouve Oh! Deus"
"Contigo Habitarei"
"Aquele que Habita"
"Me Levanta com Tua Destra"
"Te Busco Ansiosamente"

Personnel
Luiz Arcanjo (lead vocals)
Davi Sacer (lead vocals)
Verônica Sacer (lead vocals)
André Mattos (drums)
Ronald Fonseca (keyboard, piano, produce)
Deco Rodrigues (bass)
Isaac Ramos (guitar)

References

2009 albums
Trazendo a Arca albums